Alistair Espinoza (born 9 February 1991) is a Trinidad and Tobago male badminton player.

Achievements

BWF International Challenge/Series
Mixed Doubles

 BWF International Challenge tournament
 BWF International Series tournament
 BWF Future Series tournament

References

External links 
 

Living people
1991 births
Trinidad and Tobago male badminton players
Competitors at the 2014 Central American and Caribbean Games